The Men's League for Women's Suffrage was a society formed in 1907 in London and was part of the women's suffrage movement in the United Kingdom.

History
The society formed in 1907 in London by Henry Brailsford, Charles Corbett, Henry Nevinson, Laurence Housman, C. E. M. Joad, Hugh Franklin, Henry Harben, Gerald Gould, Charles Mansell-Moullin, Israel Zangwill and 32 others. Graham Moffat founded the Northern Men's League for Women's Suffrage in Glasgow also in 1907 and wrote a suffrage propaganda play, The Maid and the Magistrate.

Bertrand Russell stood as a suffrage candidate in the 1907 Wimbledon by election.

By 1910 Henry Brailsford and Lord Lytton had, with Millicent Fawcett's permission, created a proposal that might have been the basis of an agreement that caused the suffrage movement to declare a truce on 14 February.

In 1911 they successfully took Liberals in Bradford to court for assaulting Alfred Hawkins. Alfred had shouted a question during a speech by Winston Churchill and he was ejected from the hall without warning. The judge considered this to be assault. Hawkins had received a fractured kneecap and he was awarded £100 plus costs.  The group heard from orators including George Lansbury, Edith Mansell-Moullin, and Victor Duval in March 1912. Speakers there expressed their disgust at the treatment of William Ball, a male suffrage supporter and hunger striker, for being not only force-fed but effectively driven to lunacy and separated from his family by the authorities. Nevison produced a pamphlet on his case for the League, with the subtitle "Official Brutality on the increase".

See also 
 Women's Social and Political Union, which included male members in the Men’s Political Union for Women’s Enfranchisement (MPU).
 Women's suffrage

References

External links 
Women's suffrage societes (archived 14 May 2006)

1907 establishments in England
Men and feminism
Men in the United Kingdom
Organizations established in 1907
Political organisations based in London
Suffrage organisations in the United Kingdom
Women's suffrage in England